Alma Bennett Morgan (24 June 1877 – 4 April 1960) was the wife of former Governor of West Virginia Ephraim F. Morgan and served as West Virginia's First Lady from 1921-1925.

Life
Alma was born in 1877 to Albert and Isabelle Bennett in Monongalia County, West Virginia. She taught school in Marion County, West Virginia. This is where she met Ephraim F. Morgan, and the two married in September 1903. As first lady, she ardently opposed the consumption of alcohol and actively campaigned for a woman's right to vote. She provided design ideas to architect Walter F. Martens in the design of the West Virginia Governor's Mansion.  They moved into the newly constructed mansion six days before leaving office. After leaving office, the Morgans lived in Washington, D.C. and in Fairmont, West Virginia.  The couple had two children. One child died at the age of fifteen months. After Ephraim died in 1950, Alma moved to Morgantown, West Virginia, where she died on April 5, 1960.

References

1877 births
1960 deaths
American suffragists
Educators from West Virginia
American women educators
First Ladies and Gentlemen of West Virginia
Morgan family of West Virginia
People from Fairmont, West Virginia
People from Monongalia County, West Virginia
American temperance activists
People from Morgantown, West Virginia